André Prébolin (19 March 1906 – 12 June 1997) was a French athlete. He competed in the men's long jump at the 1936 Summer Olympics.

References

1906 births
1997 deaths
Athletes (track and field) at the 1936 Summer Olympics
French male long jumpers
Olympic athletes of France
Place of birth missing
20th-century French people